BRP Antonio Luna (FF-151) is the second ship of the Jose Rizal-class of guided missile frigates in service with the Philippine Navy. She is able to conduct multi-role operations such anti-surface warfare (ASUW), anti-submarine warfare (ASW), and limited anti-air warfare (AAW). She is one of the service's primary warships until the introduction of new and more powerful contemporaries.

History
The BRP Antonio Luna sailed to Palawan on their first deployment.

The BRP Antonio Luna conducted a man overboard drill in the South China Sea on February 21, 2022.

The BRP Antonio Luna participated in RIMPAC 2022.

Construction and design
The BRP Antonio Luna was designed and built by Hyundai Heavy Industries (HHI) of South Korea and is a derivative of the Incheon-class frigates of the Republic of Korea Navy. Changes were made on the base design by making use of features found on newer frigates of the R.O.K. Navy, considering reduced radar cross-section by having cleaner lines, smooth surface design, reduced overhangs and a low free-board.

On September 17, 2018, the steel cutting ceremony was held for P160 (project number of second of two frigates) at HHI shipyard at the Shin Hwa Tech facility in Pohang City, South Korea, marking the first step of the ship's construction journey.

On December 20, 2018, Lorenzana announced at a press conference the names of the two future frigates being built by HHI: BRP Jose Rizal and BRP Antonio Luna.

On May 23, 2019, HHI held the keel laying ceremony for P160 at HHI shipyard, marking the formal start of the construction of the ship. In the press briefing the same day, a Hanwha official said that Link 16 will likely not be compatible for the frigates until 2020 because of issues between US and South Korea. 

On November 8, 2019, HHI launched the second ship, the prospective BRP Antonio Luna, at Ulsan shipyard in South Korea.

The ship's outfitting, sea trials and delivery were affected by restrictions due to the COVID-19 pandemic. HHI conducted sea trials to test the ship's seaworthiness, propulsion, communications, weapons and sensor systems.

On December 18, 2020, the Philippine Navy's Technical Inspection and Acceptance Committee declared that the ship is compliant with the agreed technical specifications after witnessing its sea trials. This paved way for the frigate re-docking and final outfitting before delivery.

On January 29, 2021, the prospective BRP Antonio Luna (FF-151) was approved for delivery and acceptance by a joint Department of National Defense and Philippine Navy inspection team.
 
On February 9, 2021, the ship was met by BRP Jose Rizal in the vicinity of Capones Island, Zambales after leaving South Korea four days ago. This was complemented by a fly-by of three FA-50 light fighter jets from the Philippine Air Force.

On March 19, 2021, the ship was officially commissioned as BRP Antonio Luna (FF-151). The ceremony happened at 8 o`clock in the morning at Pier 13, South Harbor, Manila. It was attended by Philippine Defense Secretary Delfin Lorenzana and Philippine Navy Rear Admiral Adelius Bordado.

See also
 BRP Jose Rizal (FF-150)

References 

Jose Rizal-class frigates
2019 ships
Ships built by Hyundai Heavy Industries Group